Hubert Braun (5 November 1939 – 19 February 2012) was a German bobsledder. He competed in the two-man and the four-man events at the 1964 Winter Olympics.

References

1939 births
2012 deaths
German male bobsledders
Olympic bobsledders of the United Team of Germany
Bobsledders at the 1964 Winter Olympics
Sportspeople from Garmisch-Partenkirchen